Anpanman Museum may refer to:

 Yanase Takashi Memorial Hall
 Yokohama Anpanman Children's Museum & Mall
 Nagoya Anpanman Children's Museum & Park
 Kobe Anpanman Children's Museum & Mall
 Sendai Anpanman Children's Museum & Mall
 Fukuoka Anpanman Children's Museum in Mall